"Neutron Tide" is a short story by British writer Arthur C. Clarke, first published in 1970 in Galaxy Science Fiction.  It is among his shortest pieces of writing, consisting solely of a 2-page, detailed description of a futuristic scenario in order to use a pun as a punch-line,  a play on the title of the United States' national anthem. The story was reprinted later in the 1978 Starlord summer special.

Plot summary
Clarke describes a space battleship flying too close to the gravitational field of a neutron star, and subsequently being torn to bits by the high tidal forces. A military commander revealing this in a meeting says the only identifiable piece of debris was from an engineer's toolkit, a star-mangled spanner.

See also
 "Neutron Star", a 1966 science fiction short story by Larry Niven
 "Feghoot", a short story designed to end with a pun

References

External links
 

1970 short stories
Short stories by Arthur C. Clarke
Fiction set around neutron stars
Works originally published in Galaxy Science Fiction